Copthorne is a suburb located in the western side of the county town of Shrewsbury, Shropshire, England. The population of the ward at the 2011 Census was 4,105.

Description 
Surrounding Copthorne Road, Mytton Oak Road and Shelton Road, the suburb is mainly residential and runs from the junction where Copthorne Bank meets New Street, in the north east near Frankwell Island, to the Royal Shrewsbury Hospital (previously known as Copthorne Hospital) and the suburb of Shelton to the west, on the outskirts of town and the Radbrook Road separates Copthorne and Radbrook in the south of Copthorne.

From Frankwell, New Street runs south-west for a short way, ending by the Boat House public house and Port Hill Footbridge (leading to The Quarry). The road (the A488) continues up Porthill as Porthill Road, along the edge of the Shrewsbury School grounds, and ends at the former A5 road, the Shrewsbury bypass.

On the east side of the suburb, Copthorne Road leads from Frankwell Island, to the west up Copthorne Bank, along past the remnant of Copthorne Barracks (former headquarters of the British Army's 5th Division and 143 (West Midlands) Brigade and current headquarters of Shrewsbury Air Training Corps and the Shropshire Army Cadet Force) and the Copthorne Keep housing development that has been built on most of the barracks site, and also ends up joining the old bypass at Shelton Road.

In the suburb are many residential streets, the Sandringham Court apartment development, several small shops and public houses, a tennis club, and two schools (Woodfield Infants School and St George's Junior School).

Furthermore, on Mytton Oak Road, near the Hospital, there is the Copthorne Shopping Centre. This small development consists of a post office, Co-op supermarket, pharmacy, fish and chip shop, hairdresser and Coral (Bookmakers). On Woodfield Road by the two schools there is also Woodfield Stores, formerly known as Everington's and Mace. As well as this there is Oakfield Shopping Centre, off Oakfield Road, with a Chinese Takeaway, fitness centre and Scout and Cub Hut.

Copthorne is located in the Church of England parish of Christ Church Shelton and Oxon.

Shrewsbury Town Football Club twice had their ground in Copthorne; on Ambler's Field 1889-93 and, after an interval in Sutton Lane, Sutton Farm, on the so-called Barracks Ground (south of Copthorne Barracks) 1895-1910 before their move to the Gay Meadow.

Notable residents

William Snook, English champion runner, was living at West View, Copthorne, at the 1881 Census.
Arthur Herbert Procter, Victoria Cross recipient World War I, lived in Mytton Oak Road in later 1960s before relocating to Sheffield.

Varying definitions

Porthill is often considered a separate suburb, consisting of the areas around Porthill Road and Woodfield Road, including St George's School. As Copthorne is seen as a relatively prestigious address within Shrewsbury, it is common for people to claim to live there, and for estate agents and businesses to describe addresses as Copthorne, when according to most local definitions they lie in other areas. In particular, Gains Park, a 1980s housing estate west of the hospital, is often passed off as Copthorne (or sometimes as Shelton or Bicton Heath- despite sharing the SY3 postcode it is completely separated from Copthorne and Shelton while Bicton Heath refers to an older settlement along the A458. The boundary with Radbrook Green is similarly ill-defined, often drawn along Radbrook Road although this means that the Rad Brook barely touches the suburb named for it.

References

Suburbs of Shrewsbury